Mussel Shoals may refer to:

 Mussel Shoals, California
 Muscle Shoals, Alabama, sometimes misspelled "Mussel Shoals"

See also 
 Muscle Shoals (disambiguation)